Pythium mastophorum is a plant pathogen infecting pocketbook plants (Calceolaria crenatiflora).

References

External links
 Index Fungorum
 USDA ARS Fungal Database

Water mould plant pathogens and diseases
mastophorum
Species described in 1930